Cidade Dutra is one of 96 districts in the city of São Paulo, Brazil.

Neighborhoods of Cidade Dutra 

Chácara Meyer
Chácara Monte Sol
Cidade Dutra
Conjunto Residencial Salvador Tolezani
Granja Nossa Senhora Aparecida
Jardim Alpino
Jardim Amélia
Jardim Ana Lúcia
Jardim Angelina
Jardim Beatriz
Jardim Bichinhos
Jardim Bonito
Jardim Clipper
Jardim Colonial
Jardim Cristal
Jardim Cruzeiro
Jardim das Camélias
Jardim das Imbuias
Jardim das Praias
Jardim do Alto
Jardim Edilene
Jardim Edith
Jardim Floresta
Jardim Graúna
Jardim Guanabara
Jardim Guanhembu
Jardim Ícara
Jardim Império
Jardim Iporanga
Jardim Jordanópolis 
Jardim Kika
Jardim Kioto
Jardim Lallo
Jardim Leblon
Jardim Mália
Jardim Marcel
Jardim Maria Rita
Jardim Maringa
Jardim Nizia
Jardim Orion
Jardim Panorama
Jardim Pouso Alegre
Jardim Presidente
Jardim Primavera
Jardim Progresso
Jardim Quarto Centenário
Jardim Real
Jardim Rêgis
Jardim Represa
Jardim República
Jardim Rio Bonito
Jardim Rosalina
Jardim Samambaia
Jardim Santa Rita 
Jardim São Benedito 
Jardim São Rafael 
Jardim Satélite
Jardim Toca
Parque Alto do Rio Bonito
Parque Atlântico
Parque das Árvores 
Parque do Castelo 
Parque Esmeralda
Parque Nações Unidas 
Parque Paulistinha
Recanto dos Sonhos
Rio Bonito
Terceira Divisão de Interlagos 
Vila da Paz 
Vila Diana
Vila Progresso
Vila Quintana 
Vila Represa 
Vila Rubi 
Vila São José 
Vila Vera

See also
 Primavera-Interlagos (CPTM) Train station
 Autódromo (CPTM) Train station
 Line 9 (CPTM)
 Interlagos Racetrack
 Roman Catholic Diocese of Santo Amaro

Notes

References

External links

 Interlagos News
 Gazette of Interlagos
 Roman Catholic Diocese of Santo Amaro

Districts of São Paulo